SICM is an abbreviation that may refer to:

 Scanning ion-conductance microscopy, a scanning probe microscopy technique that uses an electrode as the probe tip
 Society of Intensive Care Medicine, Singapore-based representative body for intensive care medicine
 Structure and Interpretation of Classical Mechanics, a classical mechanics textbook